San Romano is a town in Tuscany, central Italy, administratively a frazione of the comuni of Montopoli in Val d'Arno and San Miniato, province of Pisa. At the time of the 2001 census its population was 4,417.

San Romano is about 38 km from Pisa, 3 km from Montopoli in Val d'Arno and 10 km from San Miniato.

The place is known for being the scene of the battle of San Romano (1432), which was later depicted by Paolo Uccello in his famous composition bearing the same name.

Main sights 
 Sanctuary of the Madonna di San Romano

References 

Frazioni of the Province of Pisa